Philippe Joseph Parmentier (15 November 1787 – 5 May 1867) was a Belgian sculptor.

Life and work
Philippe Joseph Parmentier was born in Feluy in 1787. He was a son of the sculptor Antoine François Parmentier and Marie Madeleine Remiens. He received his first training from his father and studied at the École des Beaux-Arts in Paris, where he was a student of, among others, François Joseph Bosio. Parmentier exhibited several times, including at the Brussels and Ghent Salon and the Exhibition of Living Masters in Amsterdam (1824) and Haarlem (1825). In 1836 he was appointed professor at the Royal Academy of Fine Arts in Ghent, a position he held until 1850.

References

Notes

External links

Year of birth uncertain
1784 births
1787 births
1867 deaths
19th-century Belgian sculptors
19th-century Belgian male artists
People from Seneffe